The Taba Hotel & Nelson Village is a resort hotel in Taba, Egypt. Built between 1979 and 1982, it was the stumbling block in negotiations between Israel and Egypt over the final border between the two countries. After months of negotiation and a decision by an international arbitration to grant Egypt the tiny strip of land, the hotel was finally sold to Egypt for $35 million. The hotel was part of the Hilton brand for nearly 30 years from 1990 until 2017, when it was renovated and reopened as the Taba Hotel & Nelson Village by Deutsche Hospitality.

History
Eliyahu Paposchado built the property as the  Aviya Sonesta Beach Hotel beginning in 1979,  from Eilat and next to the near-legendary Rafi Nelson's Nelson Village, also known as Rafi Nelson's Holiday Village, while the Sinai was under Israeli control. The village was a center for musical and cultural activity and attracted Israel's Who's Who in the late 1960s and 1970s. The hotel itself was immediately considered one of Israel's premier hotels and would later prove to be a problem in the ensuing talks between the two nations. After the peace agreements were signed in 1979 between the two nations, the status of the hotel and village were to be decided on future negotiations. In 1986, an international panel ruled that the land would be returned to Egypt, but that Israelis would be free to visit the tiny strip without paying a tax (to this day tourists do not pay a tax when travelling between Eilat and the hotel). In January 1989 the hotel and adjacent village was turned over to Egypt. Remnants of the hotel's past are still prominent within the hotel. The hotel became the Hilton Taba in 1990.

It was very popular with Israeli tourists until it was targeted by terrorists in the 2004 Sinai Bombings. 34 people died and hundreds were wounded in the attack. Since then, the hotel has undergone major renovations and has seen a drastic drop in Israeli tourists. Hilton Hotels international, today Hilton Worldwide, denied liability to the victims of the terror attack on its grounds and refused to compensate its guests. Some victims sought compensation through legal challenges in Miami and New York, but the lawsuits were ultimately dismissed for forum non conveniens. Subsequently an Israeli court ruled that the victims were not entitled to compensation by the Hilton corporation.

In 2017, the hotel was purchased by Deutsche Hospitality, renovated, and reopened as the Taba Hotel & Nelson Village. The operator is Steigenberger Hotels and Resorts.

See also
 2004 Sinai bombings

References

External links
 Taba Hotel & Nelson Village website

Hotels in Egypt
Taba
Egypt–Israel relations
Former Israeli settlements in Sinai
Hotels established in 1982
Hotel buildings completed in 1982
1982 establishments in Egypt